is the first single of the subgroup Petitmoni. It was released on November 25, 1999 and sold 1,123,610 copies, peaking at number one on the Oricon charts in Japan.

It was later covered by bubblegum dance group Smile.dk as "Petite Love"; This cover was featured on their remix album, SMiLE Paradise.

In 2013, Yuimetal of the kawaii metal group Babymetal performed a cover during their Legend 1999 show at NHK Hall. The song was chosen because it was a hit in 1999, the year of her and fellow member Moametal's birth.

Track listing 
 
 Lyrics and composition by Tsunku; Arrangement by Ken Matsubara
 "Dream & Kiss"
 Lyrics and composition by Tsunku; Arrangement by Takao Konishi
 "Chokotto Love (Instrumental)"

Featured lineup 
 Sayaka Ichii
 Kei Yasuda
 Maki Goto

References

External links 
 Chokotto Love entry on Hello! Project official website 

Petitmoni songs
Zetima Records singles
1999 singles
Oricon Weekly number-one singles
Japanese-language songs
Song recordings produced by Tsunku
Songs written by Tsunku
1999 songs